XXIII Brigade, Royal Field Artillery was a brigade of the Royal Field Artillery which served in the First World War.

It was originally formed with 107th, 108th and 109th Batteries, and attached to 3rd Division. In August 1914 it mobilised and was sent to the Continent with the British Expeditionary Force, where it saw service with 3rd Division until 1917. 109th Battery left the brigade in mid-1916 to join CCLXXXI Brigade in 56th (London) Division.

In 1917 it was withdrawn from 3rd Division, to operate under higher unit control, and served out the rest of the war in this role.

Notes

References

Sources
 Maj A.F. Becke,History of the Great War: Order of Battle of Divisions, Part 1: The Regular British Divisions, London: HM Stationery Office, 1934/Uckfield: Naval & Military Press, 2007, .
 Maj A.F. Becke,History of the Great War: Order of Battle of Divisions, Part 2a: The Territorial Force Mounted Divisions and the 1st-Line Territorial Force Divisions (42–56), London: HM Stationery Office, 1935/Uckfield: Naval & Military Press, 2007, .

External links
Royal Field Artillery Brigades
3rd Division Order of Battle

Royal Field Artillery brigades
Artillery units and formations of World War I